Han Nyein Oo (born Soe Naing (စိုးနိုင်), in 1989), is a Burmese social media personality, pro-military supporter and lobbyist. Before the Myanmar coup d'état, he was considered  one of the main sources for Burmese celebrity gossip and yellow journalism.

Career
He started his career as a celebrity gossip reporter on Facebook. After having been banned from Facebook, he moved his commentary to Telegram. Following the 2021 Myanmar coup d'état, he became a lobbyist for the junta. Han Nyein Oo had more than 100,000 subscribers on Telegram. He has been accused of using revenge porn against female activists whom he opposes.

Han Nyein Oo has been accused of engaging police officers and military troops to ordering them to make arrests and carry out attacks on anti-junta activists and supporters of NUG. Han Nyein Oo has investigated and conveyed personal information of anti-military dissidents, NUG supporters and donors of PDF.

His channel became increasingly influential among the highest military council and lower-level military authorities.

He posted about shop owners who have notified on social media that the store would be closed on February 1 on which the silent strike would be conducted. This led to the arrest of 200 people including shop owners.

Model Thin Thin sued Han Nyein Oo in 2020 for posting her gossip on Facebook. He was charged under Section 66 (d) of the telecommunications law, which outlaws online defamation. In revenge, Thin Thin and the film director Wyne were arrested  after he posted their information in February 2022.

As a main source for arrest news, Radio Free Asia (RFA) and many Burmese civil society groups are monitoring Han Nyein Oo's reports. Political activists who were disclosed on the channel in January and February were arrested by military authorities within hours. Victims have also had their homes and business property confiscated. According to RFA, due to Han Nyein Oo's reports more than 200 people have been arrested and have had their property confiscated, including notably Pencilo, Mg Mg Aye, Chan Chan, Daung, Chit Thu Wai and Paing Phyo Thu.

Writer Naing Thint Myat urges the public to oppose the military's arrest of activists by order of Han Nyein Oo. Deputy minister of Information Major General Zaw Min Tun said at a military press conference that Han Nyein Oo was not affiliated with the military and did not order him.

On 12 March 2022, Telegram removed the channels of Han Nyein Oo and Thazin Oo because of standards violations.

On 19 April 2022, the comedian Kaung Kyaw was arrested by military forces two days after Han Nyein Oo's report.

References

Living people
1989 births
Lobbyists